The first season of Squadra Antimafia - Parlermo oggi premiered on Canale 5 on 31 March 2009. The cast includes Simona Cavallari, Giulia Michelini, Claudio Gioè, Ninni Bruschetta, Silvia De Santis, Lele Vannoli, Marco Leonardi, Massimo Poggio, Vincent Riotta, Sergio Friscia, Luca Angeletti, Jacopo Cavallaro, Paolo Ricca, Claudio Castrogiovanni, Peppe Lanzetta, and Bruno Torrisi.

Italian television series